John Andrew Jackson was an American abolitionist in the nineteenth century. He was born into slavery on a country plantation in Sumter County, South Carolina. His escape north to Canada may have been one of many slave experiences that inspired Harriet Beecher Stowe's Uncle Tom's Cabin. During the American Civil War, Jackson published The Experience of a Slave in South Carolina (1862) while in Great Britain.

Early life
Jackson had a condescending relationship with his owner and mistress, as many slaves did, although he was the primary object of their ire. He grew up surrounded by brutality. For example, his master would whip Jackson for his disobedience. Jackson's first job was being a scarecrow in the cornfields. He would stand every day posing as a scarecrow in the hot Carolina fields. When he was older, he was ordered to manage the plow but, due to his lack of strength, he was unable to manage the plow effectively. Despite this, he attracted a woman named Louisa Clifton, who later became his wife.

Family
Louisa lived on the plantation about a mile away. Jackson and Louisa were unofficially married and had two children. He was prohibited from visiting his wife and children, but would often sneak out to be with his family. Jackson would be whipped, but persisted and continued to see his wife and children until his wife's master moved to Georgia. His mother, Betty, and father,  John Andrew (known as Dr. Clavern) had 10 children, although 2 died before he escaped in 1846. In 1846, after separation from his family, he fled slavery. Later, after he escaped to Canada and remarried but, his second wife died in an asylum. Jackson married for the third time and had two more children.

Escape
As a child, the idea of freedom became more important to Jackson. One day, he bought a pony from one of the slaves on a neighbouring plantation. When the mistress found out, she threatened to have the pony killed. Hearing of the mistress's plan, Jackson hid the pony until Christmas. On Christmas Day, Jackson took his pony and escaped from his plantation, never to see his parents again. As he rode to Boston, Jackson met many white people who asked where he was going. Jackson would respond by saying that he was on his way to his plantation. Eventually, he arrived at the Santa Fe River where he boarded a small ship run by a black man. Jackson and his pony were dropped near land but had to struggle upstream to reach it. After almost drowning, Jackson and his pony made it to shore.

Jackson learned about the badge that all African Americans had to produce to prove they were allowed to be free. Not having a badge, he sold his pony to buy a cloak to hide from patrolmen. The cloak worked to his advantage until he was able to find a ship to Boston.  He tried to board but, the crewmen refused, afraid that he was working for a white man and trying to set them up. In response, Jackson hid in a box that was loaded onto the ship's hold. Eventually, the crewmen found him and threatened to unload him on the next ship. There never was another ship and John made it to Boston safely.

From Boston, Jackson went on to settle in Salem, Massachusetts. Once settled, he sought to purchase his family members still enslaved. He sent a letter to inquire about his family, and shortly after it was received, a slave agent was sent to search for him. Jackson avoided capture and was assisted by Harriet Beecher Stowe, who gave him food, clothes, and five dollars. He later left Salem for Canada.

Freedom
In Salem, Jackson was free but not safe. He worked as a leather tanner and part-time sawmill operator until the passage of the Fugitive Slave Law which rekindled his fear of being returned to slavery. Jackson then escaped across the border to Canada.

Once in Canada, John Andrew settled in Saint John, New Brunswick. He legally remarried and had more children.

Still seeking to purchase his enslaved family members, he journeyed to Great Britain with his wife to solicit contributions. He lectured in Scotland and England with several others, including David Guthrie, Rev. Thomas Candlish, and Julia Griffiths.

John Andrew and his wife lived in London, England until after the American Civil War ended. Eventually, they returned to live in Springfield, Massachusetts. He travelled back and forth to South Carolina for many years trying to help the freedmen of Sumter County.

References

 Jackson, John Andrew. "The Experience of a Slave in South Carolina: Electronic Edition". University Library, The University of North Carolina at Chapel Hill. 28 November 2008 http://docsouth.unc.edu/fpn/jackson/jackson.html.
 From the Black Abolitionist Papers: Vol. I: The British Isles, 1830-1865 edited by C. Peter Ripley, et al. Copyright (c) 1992 by the University of North Carolina Press. Used by permission of the publisher. www.uncpress.unc.edu. 
 Susanna Ashton, "'A Genuine Article': Harriet Beecher Stowe and John Andrew Jackson," Common-Place 13-4 (Summer 2013).
Thomas, Rhondda R. & Ashton, Susanna, eds. (2014). The South Carolina Roots of African American Thought. Columbia: University of South Carolina Press. "John Andrew Jackson (c. 1825-c. 1896)," p. 53-56.

External links
 The Experience of a Slave in South Carolina. London: Passmore & Alabaster, 1862.

19th-century American slaves
People from Sumter County, South Carolina
People who wrote slave narratives